John A. Kowalko Jr. (born September 17, 1945) is an American politician and a former Democratic member of the Delaware House of Representatives from 2006 to 2022. He represents District 25, which covers parts of Newark, Delaware. He was described as one of the first progressive members of the state legislature, which had grown to around 12 progressives by 2018.

Early life
Kowalko was born in Portsmouth, Virginia, to Adele and John Kowalko, Sr., a 24-year career Marine. He graduated from St. Joseph's Prep in 1963 and apprenticed at the Philadelphia Naval Shipyard. He was a machinist for over 30 years, including General Foreman (LL648 IAM) at the Delaware City Refinery. Kowalko also worked as a community advocate on a range of issues, including heating assistance for low-income families.

Political career
In 2006, Kowalko was elected as State Representative for the 25th District. He beat incumbent Republican Stephanie Ulbrich, who had been in office since 1994. In his first few years in office, he was instrumental in the push for the Delaware Offshore Wind Farm.

In 2009, he was named one of Delaware Today's "People of Influence" for his work on environmental issues. He is known for being an advocate of open government and has also sponsored legislation focused on consumers, public education, public utilities, health care, and state worker pensions. He regularly testifies at Public Service Commission hearings on behalf of utility consumers.

By 2015, Kowalko was known for his passionate and outspoken stances and was described as a "maverick" for being willing to publicly disagree with his own party, particularly Governor Jack Markell and other Democratic party leadership. After an attempt to remove Democratic House Speaker Peter Schwartzkopf from his leadership position, Kowalko was taken off several committees by the Speaker for being an "activist," while Kowalko called Schwartzkopf's actions an "abuse of power." Kowalko's participation in local community meetings and strong constituent support in his district has been cited as allowing him to take on his own party leadership.

Kowalko and State Senator Dave Lawson sponsored a bi-partisan bill to allow parents and their children to "opt out" of statewide standardized testing, which was supported by the Delaware State Education Association (DSEA) and the Delaware Parent Teacher Association (PTA). After two contentious committee hearings, the bill passed both houses nearly unanimously but was vetoed by Governor Markell. Kowalko and Lawson criticized the action and attempted the first veto override since 1977, but it ultimately failed in the House after being blocked from debate.

In 2018, Kowalko described the actions of Democratic Governor John Carney as "Trumpian" after Carney used an Executive Order to enact budget restructuring that failed to pass the General Assembly and was opposed by Kowalko.

In 2022, Kowalko did not seek reelection and was replaced by Cyndie Romer.

Electoral history
In 2004, Kowalko lost his first election to incumbent Republican Representative Stephanie Ulbrich in the general election.
In 2006, Kowalko won a rematch with Ulbrich in the general election with 2,473 votes (52.0%).
In 2008, Kowalko won the general election with 5,008 votes (73.4%) against Republican nominee James Gates.
In 2010, Kowalko won the general election with 3,402 votes (65.5%) against Republican nominee Gordon Winegar.
In 2012, Kowalko was unopposed in the general election and won 5,674 votes.
In 2014, Kowalko was unopposed in the general election and won 3,098 votes.
In 2016, Kowalko won the general election with 5,123 votes (68.6%) against Republican nominee Michael Nagorski.
In 2018, Kowalko won the general election with 4,027 votes (64.8%) against his Republican challenger.

References

External links
Official page at the Delaware General Assembly
Campaign site
 

1945 births
Living people
Democratic Party members of the Delaware House of Representatives
People from Newark, Delaware
Politicians from Portsmouth, Virginia
21st-century American politicians